The St. Nicholas of Myra Church is an American Carpatho-Russian Orthodox Diocese (ACROD) church dedicated to Saint Nicholas, located at 288 East 10th Street, on the corner of Avenue A in the East Village neighborhood of Manhattan, New York City, across from Tompkins Square Park.

The church was built in 1883 as the Memorial Chapel of St. Mark's Church in-the-Bowery, designed in Gothic Revival style by James Renwick Jr. – who also designed Grace Church and St. Patrick's Cathedral – and W. H. Russell.  The chapel was a gift of Rutherfurd Stuyvesant, a descendant of the Dutch governor Peter Stuyvesant, in memory of his wife.

The church later became the Holy Trinity Slovak Lutheran Church, and then, in 1925, the ACROD rented it for use as the Church of St. Nicholas of Myra, and bought it outright in 1937.  The church draws its parishioners from the tri-state area: New York, New Jersey and Connecticut.

See also
James Renwick Jr.
St. Mark's Church in-the-Bowery
Eastern Orthodoxy in North America

References
Notes

Source

External links

Churches completed in 1848
19th-century Episcopal church buildings
Orthodox Church in America churches
James Renwick Jr. church buildings
Churches in Manhattan
Gothic Revival church buildings in New York City
Former Episcopal church buildings in New York City
Former Lutheran churches in the United States
Christian organizations established in 1925
Religious organizations established in 1883
Rusyn-American culture in New York (state)
Slovak-American culture in New York (state)
East Village, Manhattan
Eastern Orthodox churches in New York City
1883 establishments in New York (state)